New Money is an American reality television series that premiered on May 29, 2015 on the E! cable network. The six-part series documents how the extremely rich spend their money and the lifestyles they lead. The series is produced by Leftfield Pictures.

The series premiered in the United States on May 29, 2015 to 221,000 viewers. The opening episode lost 183,000 viewers from its lead-in The Soup. In Australia, the series premiered on June 3, 2015 on the Australian version of E!.

Episodes

References

External links 
 
 
 

2010s American reality television series
2015 American television series debuts
2015 American television series endings
English-language television shows
E! original programming
Upper class culture in the United States